Fremont Falls is a waterfall located in Hanover, Indiana. At , it is the highest waterfall in Indiana.

Location

Fremont Falls is located a few miles south of Hanover in Jefferson County. The waterfall is located on private property just southwest of the intersection of Fremont Falls Road and River Bluff Drive. Chain Mill Falls is located northwest of Fremont Falls in the same gorge.

References

External links
Fremont Falls: Flickr

Waterfalls of Indiana
Landforms of Jefferson County, Indiana
Tourist attractions in Jefferson County, Indiana